Panic & Action is a Swedish record label based in Åmål and Örebro.

History 
Panic & Action was founded in 2008 by Kid Down vocalist Eric Höjdén and Peter Ahlqvist (founder of Burning Heart Records). Most famous bands who are currently signed to the label are Her Bright Skies, Adept and Chemical Vocation. Other musicians who signe to Panic & Action are Social Siberia (solo-project of Chemical Vocation guitarist Joakim Jensen), Walking with Strangers (Deathcore) and The Shiloh.

Panic & Action distributes their recordings worldwide. They organize a Sampler called Burn All the Small Towns featuring all signed bands and Kid Down and the Panic & Action Tour. On October 30, 2014, the label announced its closure. Instead, Burning Heart Records was reactivated and the label's artists will be transferred to the new label.

Bands

Currently signed 
 Her Bright Skies (post-hardcore)
 Walking With Strangers (Progressive metalcore)
 Chemical Vocation (Punk rock)
 The Shiloh (Punk rock)
 Joakim Jensen (Social Siberia) (Acoustic rock)
 Aim For The Sunrise (Metalcore)

Previously signed 
 Adept (Metalcore, post-hardcore)

References

External links 
 Official Homepage

Swedish record labels